The Awraba were a Berber tribe in North Africa which formed part of the Baranis confederation. They were known for playing a primary role in the resistance to the Muslim conquest of the Maghreb during the 7th century, particularly during the rebellion led by their king Kusaila. After this event, having mostly converted to Islam, they were known for welcoming Idris I, an 'Alid refugee fleeing the 'Abbasids to the east, and helping him establish the Idrisid dynasty.

References 

Berber peoples and tribes